Schlenkerla is a historic brewpub in Bamberg, Franconia, Germany renowned for its smoked Aecht Schlenkerla Rauchbier.

Beers

Aecht Schlenkerla is recognized for making traditional Rauchbier (smoked beer) including urbock, märzen, weizen, oak doppelbock, lentbeer (Fastenbier), a Helles Marzen blend (Krausen), Helles (filtered and unfiltered) and Hansla (low alcohol).  The brewery releases vintages of the Doppelbock and Urbock that have been aged in rock cellars. A schnapps made from Rauchbier is also available in Schlenkerla's pub and restaurant. 

The brewery's restaurant has been ranked among the top places in the world to have a beer by All About Beer magazine.

The pub
The brewery has been in operation since 1405, when it was a pub known as Zum Blauen Löwen ("At the Blue Lion"). Schlenkerla tavern features a Gothic ceiling known as the Dominikanerklause. It is located in the old town section of Bamberg, a UNESCO World Heritage site tucked away in the Franconia section of northern Bavaria. Each year the brewery celebrates "Smokebeer Preservation Day" on July 23rd. On that day in 1635 the first smoke free malt drying machine was patented. Soon most beers became smoke-free and Rauchbier became rare. Only a small number of Bamberg breweries continued the use of traditional fire kiln malt drying, preserving the style. The style is now made by a limited number of breweries around the world and is recognized at the Great American Beer Festival with a Smoke Beer category with six subcategories.

Name
Schlenkerla roughly translates as "Dangling". Schlenkern is a German verb meaning to swing or to dangle (literally "to slink").  The -la suffix is typical of the East Franconian dialect. The name reportedly comes from a brewer with a hobbling gait whose image can be seen on the Aecht Schlenkerla Rauchbier bottle. The brewery's legal name is HellerBräu Trum KG, after the Trum family that has owned and run it for six generations.

See also
 List of smoked foods

References

External links
Brauereiausschank Schlenkerla - official website of the Schlenkerla historical brewery and tavern
bamberger-bier.de - information about Bamberg's brewing tradition 
Photo Sphere of Brewpub

Buildings and structures in Bamberg
Beer and breweries in Bavaria
Drinking establishments in Germany
German beer culture
Companies established in the 15th century
1405 establishments
Organizations established in the 1400s